The following is a list of episodes of the Irish television crime drama series Red Rock, first broadcast on TV3 on 7 January 2015 and BBC One in the UK on 11 July 2016. To date, 176 episodes have been broadcast (115 full episodes, 176 counting each episode initially being split into two parts in Ireland, each 30 minutes long including advertisements. In the United Kingdom, each episode was broadcast as a single 45 minute transmission, without advertisements).

Following a major overhaul in the summer of 2016, each episode was a single 60 minute transmission, including advertisements. The series was also moved to a post-watershed timeslot to allow for grittier storylines. A special-double episode, co-written by actor Shaun Williamson, was broadcast on 9 January 2017 as a single 120 minute transmission. The second series was broadcast in the UK between 17 July and 8 September 2017. The first twenty-five episodes of the third series were broadcast from 16 July 2018, with a further ten episodes broadcast from 15 July 2019. The final two episodes were broadcast in Ireland in January 2020, and in the UK the following March.

Transmissions

Episodes

Series 1 (2015)

Series 2 (2016–2017)

Series 3 (2017—2020)

References

External links
Official website
 

Lists of Irish television series episodes
Television episodes set in the Republic of Ireland